is the ninth single by Japanese singer/songwriter Mari Hamada, from the album of the same title. Written by Hamada and Hiroyuki Ohtsuki, the single was released by Invitation on April 19, 1989. The song was used by Kanebo Cosmetics for their commercials starring Nene Otsuka. It was included in the 2015 soundtrack album Yakuza 0 80's Hits! Collection.

The single became Hamada's first and only No. 1 on Oricon's singles chart. It was also certified Platinum by the RIAJ.

Track listing

Personnel 
 Michael Landau – guitar
 John Pierce – bass
 Randy Kerber – keyboards
 John Keane – drums, percussion

Chart positions

Certification

Cyntia version 

"Return to Myself ~ Shinai, Shinai, Natsu." was covered by Japanese all-female power metal band Cyntia as their second single, released on July 31, 2013, by Colourful Records. Three versions of the single were released: a stand-alone single, the Type-A single with a DVD copy of the music video, and the Type-B single with a promotional bikini top.

The single peaked at No. 36 on Oricon's singles chart.

Track listing

Chart positions

Other cover versions 
 Mi covered the song in their 2006 album 80s x Mi.
 Demon Kakka covered the song in his 2007 cover album Girls' Rock.
 Ayumi Shibata covered the song in her 2014 album kick start.

References

External links 
Mari Hamada
 
 

Cyntia
 
 

1989 singles
1989 songs
2013 singles
Japanese-language songs
Mari Hamada songs
Oricon Weekly number-one singles
Victor Entertainment singles